Repton is a village and civil parish in the South Derbyshire district of Derbyshire, England, located on the edge of the River Trent floodplain, about  north of Swadlincote. The population taken at the 2001 Census was 2,707, increasing to 2,867 at the 2011 Census.

The village is noted for St Wystan's Church, Repton School and the Anglo-Saxon Repton Abbey and medieval Repton Priory.

History

Christianity was reintroduced to the Midlands at Repton, where some of the Mercian royal family under Peada were baptised in AD 653. Soon a double abbey under an abbess was built.

In 669 the Bishop of Mercia translated his see from Repton to Lichfield. Offa, King of Mercia, seemed to resent his own bishops paying allegiance to the Archbishop of Canterbury in Kent who, while under Offa's control, was not of his own kingdom of Mercia. Offa therefore created his own Archdiocese of Lichfield, which presided over all the bishops from the Humber to the Thames. Repton was thus the forebear of the archdiocese of Lichfield, a third archdiocese of the English church: Lichfield, the other two being Canterbury and York. This lasted for only 16 years, however, before Mercia returned to being under the Archbishopric of Canterbury.

At the centre of the village is the Church of England parish church dedicated to Saint Wigstan of Mercia.

In 873–74 the Great Heathen Army overwintered at Repton, one of only a few places in England where a Viking winter camp has been located. Excavations from 1974 to 1988 found a D-shaped earthwork on a bluff, overlooking an arm of the River Trent, and opened a mound containing a mass grave. The mass grave contained the remains of at least 264 individuals. The bones were disarticulated and mostly jumbled together. Forensic study revealed that the individuals ranged in age from their late teens to about forty, 80% were male where sex could be determined. Five associated pennies fit well with the overwintering date of 873–74 and this date was later confirmed by a reassessment of the radiocarbon dates.

An early 18th century account describes how, in the last quarter of the 17th century, Thomas Walker, a workman looking for stone, opened the mound and found the skeleton of a "nine foot tall" man in a stone coffin in the remains of a building. According to the account, human bones had been neatly stacked around the coffin.

Parish church

The church is notable for its Anglo-Saxon crypt, which was built in the 8th century AD as a mausoleum for the Mercian royal family. Wystan, or Wigstan, was a prince of Mercia who was murdered by his guardian in 849, in the reign of Wiglaf. His remains were buried in the crypt at Repton and miracles were ascribed to them. Repton proceeded to become a place of pilgrimage; Wigstan was later canonised and became the patron saint of the church.
At the north edge of the village is St Wystan's Church, an Anglo-Saxon church dedicated to the Anglo-Saxon Saint Wystan (or Wigstan) and designated by English Heritage as a Grade I listed building. The 8th-century crypt beneath the church was the original burial place of Saint Wigstan, as well as his grandfather, King Wiglaf of Mercia. Also buried there is King Æthelbald of Mercia, under whose reign the building was first constructed, and for whom it was first converted to a mausoleum. Upon the burial of St Wigstan, the crypt became a shrine and place of pilgrimage.

The cruciform Anglo-Saxon church itself has had several additions and restorations throughout its history. These include Medieval Gothic north and south aisles in the nave that were rebuilt in the 13th century and widened early in the 14th century, and the addition in 1340 of the west tower and recessed spire. The church was also restored between 1885 and 1886 by Arthur Blomfield.

Notable residents

King Æthelbald of Mercia was buried here in 757.
Beornred of Mercia was buried here
Saint Guthlac of Croyland was a monk here in about 697.
Russell Osman, Ipswich Town & international footballer, was born here in 1959.
 King Wiglaf of Mercia was buried here
 Basil Rathbone lived in his childhood here
 Saint Wigstan of Mercia was buried here, although his remains were later removed to Evesham Abbey
 Walter Somers, engineer and industrialist, was born in Repton in 1839.
 Elsie Steele (1899–2010), the oldest documented person in Britain at the time of her death, lived at the Dales Residential Home during the final few years of her life.

See also
Listed buildings in Repton

Gallery

References

Further reading

External links

Villages in Derbyshire
Mercian settlements
Civil parishes in Derbyshire
South Derbyshire District